Tyler Peak is a  mountain summit located in Clallam County of Washington state. It is situated in the northeastern Olympic Mountains, near the northern end of Gray Wolf Ridge, and is set within Buckhorn Wilderness, on land managed by the Olympic National Forest. The next highest neighbor is Mt. Baldy, two miles to the west. 

Old-growth forests of Douglas fir, western hemlock, and western redcedar grow on the lower slopes surrounding the peak. Like the nearby town of Sequim  to the north, Tyler Peak lies in the rain shadow of the Olympic Mountains. This landform's name has been officially adopted by the U.S. Board on Geographic Names.

Climate

Tyler Peak is located in the marine west coast climate zone of western North America. Most weather fronts originate in the Pacific Ocean, and travel east toward the Olympic Mountains. As fronts approach, they are forced upward by the peaks of the Olympic Range, causing them to drop their moisture in the form of rain or snowfall (Orographic lift). As a result, the Olympics experience high precipitation, especially during the winter months in the form of snowfall. During winter months, weather is usually cloudy, but due to high pressure systems over the Pacific Ocean that intensify during summer months, there is often little or no cloud cover during the summer. The months July through September offer the most favorable weather for viewing or climbing this peak.

Climbing routes

Established ascent routes on Tyler Peak:

 via the ridge between Baldy and Tyler Peak - 
 via the Dungeness River Road at Tyler Creek - class 2

Gallery

See also

 Geology of the Pacific Northwest

References

External links
 Weather: Tyler Peak
 Buckhorn Wilderness: fs.usda.gov

Mountains of Washington (state)
Olympic Mountains
Landforms of Clallam County, Washington
North American 1000 m summits